John Mansell was a baseball player.

John Mansell may also refer to:

John Mansell, Presidents of Queens' College, Cambridge
John Maunsell or Mansell, English politician
John Mansell, High Sheriff of Northamptonshire

See also
John Mansel (disambiguation)